Quemigny may refer to several communes in France:
 Quemigny-Poisot, in the Côte-d'Or department
 Quemigny-sur-Seine, in the Côte-d'Or department